Gomezserracin is a municipality of Segovia, Castilla y Leon, Spain. It has an area of 30.26 km² and through which it crosses the A-601, the highway of Pinares. In 2017, it had 699 inhabitants.

History 
It was founded by the noble Gomez Sarracin in the 13th century, who gave its name to the place. He was the father of Fernando Sarracin, who became bishop of Segovia.

Shield 
The shield representing the municipality was officially approved on January 28, 2016.

Parties 
 San Isidro Labrador. It is celebrated on May 15 and the saint is brought to Zamorana decorated with flowers.
 Saint Anthony of Padua. It is celebrated on July 13 and is the town's patron.
 Santa Maria Magdalena. It is celebrated on July 22, is the patron saint and the holidays are the largest in the municipality.

References

Municipalities in the Province of Segovia